Bart Yasso, the "mayor of running", is Runner's World's Chief Running Officer. Yasso is one of a few people to have completed races on all seven continents, including the Mount Kilimanjaro marathon, and won the 1987 U.S. National Biathlon Long Course Championship.

Among marathon trainers, Yasso is the namesake of the "Yasso 800s," believed to be an indication of marathon goal time.

He is a member of the Running USA Hall of Champions for both his accomplishments and his work to promote the sport of running.

References

American male marathon runners
American male biathletes
Living people
Year of birth missing (living people)
Place of birth missing (living people)